Ian Duncan Hunter Stewart  is a retired police officer who served as the Commissioner of the Queensland Police Service from 2012 until 2019. In 2019 Stewart was appointed the Queensland State Recovery Coordinator.

Career

Stewart was inducted as a constable to the Queensland Police Force with registered number 8661 on 14 December 1973, after growing up in Toowoomba. Six of his first seven years was spent policing in Townsville. He completed a Master of Public Policy and Administration and a Bachelor of Business qualifications.  

From Deputy Commissioner (Regional Operations) he was announced as Commissioner of the Queensland Police Service on 3 September 2012, commencing 1 November 2012.  

On 1 January 2013 Stewart announced the commencement of the Queensland Police Service Renewal Program, which included organisational restructure. The review proposed a new vision for the Service with key objectives being to stop crime, make the community safer and build relationships across the community, aimed at delivering improved frontline policing and community services.

His contract was extended for three more years, from 1 November 2017. Stewart however prior to contract expiry announced his retirement on 25 February 2019 to take effect in July 2019. 

On 18 October 2019 Stewart was named the new State Recovery Coordinator by Premier Annastacia Palaszczuk.

Honours and awards

References

External links

 QPS Welcome Message from the Commissioner

Commissioners of the Queensland Police
Living people
Officers of the Order of Australia
Recipients of the Australian Police Medal
University of Southern Queensland alumni
Year of birth missing (living people)